Terrorist Threats is the second and final studio album by American West Coast hip hop supergroup Westside Connection. It was released on December 9, 2003 through Hoo-Bangin'/Capitol Records. Production was handled by Young Tre, Bruce Waynne, Dirty Swift, Pockets, Rashad Coes, Big Tank, Damizza, DJ Jamal, Fredwreck, Megahertz, Neff-U, and Sir Jinx, with Ice Cube and Mack 10 serving as executive producers. It features guest appearances from K-Mac, Butch Cassidy, Young Soprano ( Deviossi), Knoc-turn'al, Nate Dogg, Skoop Delania, and Keith David, who voiced the intro track "Threat to the World", and parts of "Potential Victims" and "Gangsta Nation". The album debuted at number 16 on the Billboard 200 with first-week sales of 136,000 copies sold in the US. It has since sold 679,000 records in the US and has been certified Gold by the RIAA on January 12, 2004.

Track listing 

Notes
Tracks 1, 3 and 4 featured vocals by Keith David
Tracks 8 and 12 featured additional vocals by Bruce Waynne
Track 11 featured additional vocals by Mr. Holloway and Spider Loc

Sample credits
Track 5 contains a sample from the video "Bum Fights"
Track 6 contains a sample from the movie American Pimp
Track 8 contains elements from the song "Gangster of Love" written by David Byrne, Chris Frantz, Jerry Harrison and Tina Weymouth and performed by Talking Heads

Personnel

Dedrick "Mack 10" Rolison – main performer, executive producer, A&R
O'Shea "Ice Cube" Jackson – main performer, executive producer
William "WC" Calhoun Jr. – main performer
Nathaniel "Nate Dogg" Hale – featured artist (track 4)
Danny "Butch Cassidy" Means – featured artist (track 6)
Kelly "K-Mac" Garmon – featured artist (tracks: 7, 11)
Royal "Knoc-turn'al" Harbor – featured artist (track 10)
Jimmy "Skoop Delania" Tucker – featured artist (track 11)
Andrew "Deviossi"/"Young Soprano" Price II – featured artist (track 11)
Keith David – additional vocals (tracks: 1, 3, 4)
Waynne "Bruce Waynne" Nugent – additional vocals & producer (tracks: 8, 12)
Mr. Holloway – additional vocals (track 11)
Curtis "Spider Loc" Williams – additional vocals (track 11)
Treyvon "Young Tre" Green – producer (tracks: 2, 3, 7)
Farid "Fredwreck" Nassar – producer (track 4)
Theron "Neff-U" Feemster – producer (track 5)
Claudio "Pockets" Robles – producer (tracks: 6, 9)
Rashad Coes – producer (tracks: 6, 9)
Kevin "Dirty Swift" Risto – producer (tracks: 8, 12)
Damion "Damizza" Young – producer (track 10)
Anthony "Sir Jinx" Wheaton – producer (track 11)
J. "DJ Jamal" Hill – producer (track 11)
Derek "Big Tank" Thornton – producer (track 13)
Dorsey "Megahertz" Wesley – producer (track 14)
Andrew Shack – co-executive producer, A&R
Brian "Big Bass" Gardner – mastering
Naoto Ikeda – photography
Kevin Faist – A&R
Candyce Handley – A&R

Charts

Weekly charts

Year-end charts

Certifications

References

External links

2003 albums
Westside Connection albums
Albums produced by Damizza
Albums produced by Fredwreck
Albums produced by Midi Mafia
Albums produced by Theron Feemster
Capitol Records albums